Play It Like That is the second and final album by Australian female pop group Bardot, released in November 2001 (see 2001 in music).

The album debuted at number 16 in Australia and spawned the singles "ASAP", "I Need Somebody" and "Love Will Find a Way".

Background and release
Bardot's second studio album, and their first without Katie Underwood who initially recorded the songs ASAP and Hit-N-Run before departing the group, marked a more mature and sophisticated development in the band's sound, shedding the bubblegum pop image of their debut. While it remains very much a collection of dance-pop songs, the production is more modern and lyrically, the album is a lot more grown up than its predecessor. The album incorporates several genres – disco ("I Need Somebody"), UK garage ("Play It Like That"), R&B ("You Got Me Feeling") and funk ("It's Alright").

The album was recorded in early and mid-2001 in England and Australia with international producers such as Swedish team Murlyn Music (Britney Spears, Dannii Minogue), Ray "Madman" Hedges (Cher, Boyzone, Bryan Adams) and Ollie J (of UK electro group, Arkarna). Bardot also worked with Human Nature singer-producer Phil Burton, while the Dowlut brothers and Michael Szumowski returned. For the first time, each member contributed to the songwriting process. Belinda Chapple penned "Don't Call Me, I'll Call You" with Australian producer Michael D'Arcy, and the pair joined Tiffani Wood to write "Girls of the Night". Sally Polihronas co-wrote "You Got Me Feeling" and with Sophie Monk, the pair wrote "Feel Right".

Critical reception
The album was praised by most critics, many of whom did not expect Bardot to last past their first album. Herald Sun music editor Cameron Adams gave the album 3 stars, stating, "Bardot, more comfortable now being pop artists than just Popstars, get a big red elephant stamp for improvement with their second album." Ninemsn wrote, "they have served their apprenticeship, and deserve the success that they have worked hard for. Play It Like That will certainly launch them into the international circuit and turn heads." Adelaide's The Advertiser gave the album  stars, believing "having a greater musical input has paid dividends. The album has a fresher, more inspired sound" while Australian music site Undercover hailed the album as "a mighty creative leap [...] You are forgiven for placing nil expectation of a new Bardot album, but coming from that perspective Play It Like That is a real treat."

Track listing
 "Play It Like That" (Ollie J/Phillip Jacobs/Mary Anne Morgan)
 "I Need Somebody" (Nigel Butler/Ray Hedges/John Pickering)
 "Feel Right" (Sophie Monk/Sally Polihronas/Michael Szumowski)
 "ASAP" (Henrik Jonback/John McLaughlin/Fredrik Ödesjö)
 "Don't Call Me, I'll Call You" (Belinda Chapple/Michael D'Arcy)
 "Love Will Find a Way" (Ollie J/Phillip Jacobs/Patrick McMahon/Miki More)
 "Dirty Water" (Kelly Bryant/Sherene Dyer/Marianne Eide/Pete Ibsen/Melissa Popo/Mike Steer)
 "You Got Me Feeling" (Philippe-Marc Anquetil/Christopher Lee-Joe/Sally Polihronas)
 "It's Alright" (Traci Hale/Christopher Stewart/Philip L. Stewart/Tab)
 "Before I Let You Go" (Darren Dowlut/Dennis Dowlut/Richard Goncalves)
 "Girls of the Night" (Belinda Chapple/Michael D'Arcy/Tiffani Wood)
 "When the Cat's Away" (Henrik Jonback/John McLaughlin/Fredrik Ödesjö)

Unreleased songs 
 "Something Worth Fighting For" (Tommy Faragher/Nick Howard) 
- was originally meant to appear as a B-side on the "ASAP" CD single but was removed shortly before release. A version was later recorded by Russian singer Larisa Dolina.
 "He's Gotta Go" (Amanda Bloom)
- likely recorded for the album featuring vocals only from Belinda, Tiffany and Sophie. Sally's vocals does not appear on the track. Leaked in 2014 by Amanda Bloom after being uploaded onto her SoundCloud account.

Charts

Certifications

References

Sources
Play It Like That press release

Bardot (Australian band) albums
2001 albums